Nasomo (1956-1968) was an American Thoroughbred racehorse from the Pine Tree Stables, registered in Freeport, Bahamas. He was a son of Nasrullah.

Track record at Belmont Park

On September 4, 1959 the three-year-old colt eclipsed the track record at Belmont Park, covering the mile and a sixteenth course in 1:40 4/5. Nasomo equaled the mile record at Belmont Park, 1:34 4/5, then shared by Count Fleet and Blessbull.

Ridden by Rogelio Trejos, the thoroughbred won the feature race in a time which was four-fifths of a second faster than the standard posted by Ricci Tavi in 1957. In the $7,500 Central Park Purse, an April 25, 1960 feature race at Aqueduct Racetrack, Nasomo was at 10 to 1 odds when he triumphed in 1:36 for the mile race, while being ridden by future Hall of Fame inductee, Bobby Ussery.

Deceptive performer
In his book, "Betting Thoroughbreds", Steven Davidowitz described Nasomo as "a slow-breaking Silky Sullivan type." Davidowitz studied Nasomo's workout patterns, which the author found predicated a greatly improved performance in competition. In the late spring of 1961 Davidowitz perused Nasomo's past performance charts at Gulfstream Park. He looked particularly at the thoroughbred's half-mile workout from the starting gate which was affixed to the bottom of Nasomo's chart. ".47 bg (bay gelding)" leaped off the page at Davidowitz!

References

1956 racehorse births
1968 racehorse deaths
Racehorses bred in Kentucky
Racehorses trained in the United States
Horse racing track record setters
Thoroughbred family 1-x